During the 2014 Australian Football League (AFL) season a total of 83 Australian rules footballers made their AFL debut with 50 more playing their first game for a new club.

Summary

AFL debuts

Change of AFL club

References
Full listing of players who made their AFL or club debut in 2014

Australian rules football records and statistics
Australian rules football-related lists
Debut